Henry Pelham Archibald Douglas Pelham-Clinton, 7th Duke of Newcastle-under-Lyne (28 September 1864 – 30 May 1928), was an English nobleman, styled Earl of Lincoln until 1879.

Biography
Henry was educated at Eton College and then Magdalen College, Oxford.

He held a number of local offices appropriate to his rank and station, such as High Steward of Retford, Master Forester of Dartmoor and Keeper of St Briavel's Castle.

He had poor health and played only a small part in public life. As a staunch Anglo-Catholic he spoke on ecclesiastical issues in the House of Lords.

One of his achievements was the restoration of the fortunes of his family estate. In 1879 a serious fire destroyed much of Clumber House; he had it magnificently rebuilt to designs by the younger Charles Barry. The duke was actively involved in the rebuilding process, and in particular in the design and building of the magnificent St Mary the Virgin Chapel in the grounds. He was also responsible for the establishment of the Clumber Choir School. His Thames Valley estate was at Forest Farm in Winkfield. He was also a president of the Church of England Society for the Maintenance of the Faith.

Some of the 7th Duke's personal papers are now held at Manuscripts and Special Collections, The University of Nottingham.

Family 
He was married to Kathleen Florence May Candy in 1889.

External links 
 Biography of the 7th Duke, with links to online catalogues, from Manuscripts and Special Collections at The University of Nottingham

1864 births
1928 deaths
19th-century English nobility
20th-century English nobility
Alumni of Magdalen College, Oxford
007
Henry
English Anglo-Catholics
People educated at Eton College
People from Bassetlaw District
People from Winkfield
Members of the London School Board
Henry